Vikings is a historical drama television series written and created by Michael Hirst for the History channel. Filmed in Ireland, it premiered on March 3, 2013 in Canada. Vikings is inspired by the sagas of  Viking Ragnar Lothbrok, one of the best-known legendary Norse heroes. The series portrays Ragnar's and his family's rise from serfdom to nobility and fame through successful raids into Anglo-Saxon kingdoms and Francia. The series is also inspired by, and loosely adapts, various historical events from European history during the Early Middle Ages.

Series overview

Episodes

Season 1 (2013)

Season 2 (2014)

Season 3 (2015)

Season 4 (2016–17)

Season 5 (2017–19)

Season 6 (2019–20)

Specials

Athelstan's Journal 
A series of thirteen webisodes known as Vikings: Athelstan's Journal was released by the History Channel. Each webisode serves as a journal entry for the Vikings character Athelstan. The webisodes were released prior to and in conjunction with the beginning of the third season of Vikings, and are available on the History Channel's website. The webisodes have a running time of 1:45 to 5:01 minutes.

Saga recaps

See also

References

External links 
 
 

Lists of Canadian drama television series episodes
Lists of Irish drama television series episodes